Julius Tomin (born 2 December 1938) is a Czech philosopher. He became known in the 1970s and 1980s for his involvement with the Jan Hus Educational Foundation, which ran an underground education network in the former Czechoslovakia, offering seminars in philosophy in people's homes.

Early life and education
Tomin studied English and Russian in Czechoslovakia. Agreeing with Tolstoy's and Gandhi's views on non-violence, he refused to do military service, for which he served a prison sentence. He then tried to leave the country for Sweden, but was caught and served an additional year. When released, he took a job as a forester, then worked as a ward assistant in a psychiatric hospital, where he met his first wife, a therapist. They were married in 1962.

Interested in philosophy, Tomin wrote to Milan Machovec of Charles University, Prague, who arranged for him to register for a doctorate. He obtained his PhD and worked as a junior fellow in the university's philosophy department from 1966 to 1970.

Teaching and activism
In 1969–1970 Tomin was a visiting professor at the University of Hawaii. Barbara Day writes that he was refused an academic position when he returned to Czechoslovakia, after associating himself with the reform Communists. He worked instead as a turbine operator, but according to Day he was sacked when he was discovered teaching philosophy to his colleagues. He then worked as a nightwatchman in a zoo.

In December 1976, he became a signatory to Charter 77, which made him a further target of suspicion. The following year, he began holding philosophy seminars in his apartment. After asking for academic support for his seminars in 1978 from universities in England, Germany, and the United States, philosophers from the University of Oxford set up the Jan Hus Educational Foundation to help send books and speakers. Several of the philosophers who attended these home seminars, including Jacques Derrida, were detained by the police and asked to leave the country.

Tomin travelled with his family to the UK in August 1980, with the help of Kathy Wilkes, an Oxford philosopher, after receiving permission to study abroad. In May 1981 his Czech passport was removed by the Czech Embassy in London, and he was told that he and his wife no longer had Czech citizenship. As of 2011 he was still a British resident.

His niece is Michaela Marksová-Tominová, former minister of Labour and Social Affairs of the Czech Republic.

Selected works
"Inside the Security State," New Statesman, 7 March 1980.
"Socratic Midwifery", '"The Classical Quarterly, 37(1), 1987. 

Notes

Further reading
"West had wrong ideas on Czech tragedy—lecturer", The Glasgow Herald, 24 September 1968.
"Intimidation of Czech human rights activists reported", Associated Press, 10 October 1979.
"Prisoners that Moscow tries to hide", Associated Press, 11 October 1979.
"Professor expelled", Associated Press, 12 March 1980.
"Confronting a fear of the unknown", Boston Globe, 27 April 1980.
Bourne, Eric. "Crackdown on Czech 'study groups, Christian Science Monitor, 14 March 1980.
Cohen, Nick. "The Pub Philosopher", The Independent magazine, November 18, 1989.
Cusick, James and Gettleman, Jeffrey. Pub philosopher' on hunger strike over Plato clash", The Independent, 27 November 1995.
Midgley, Simon. "Czech exile in dialogue over Plato", The Independent, 20 August 1998.
Romano, Carlin. "Where humanity, ethics have gone", The Free Lance-Star, 17 December 2000.
Rule, Sheila. "Swindon Journal; The Thinker's Pub, With a Resident Philosopher", The New York Times, 7 November 1988.
Shepard, Richard F. "A Brutal, and True, Story", The New York Times, 11 August 1988.
Target, Simon. "Fable for High Table", Times Higher Educational, 6 October 1995.
Wilkes, Kathleen. "Unofficial Education in Czechoslovakia", Government and Opposition'', Volume 16(2), April 1981.

Charter 77 signatories
Czech philosophers
Charles University alumni
1938 births
Living people